Zyxomma elgneri is a species of dragonfly in the family Libellulidae,
known as the short-tailed duskdarter.
It is a slender and short-bodied dragonfly with dull-coloured markings. It inhabits a range of water sources including rivers, ponds and swamps in northern and eastern Australia
and New Guinea.

Gallery

See also
 List of Odonata species of Australia

References

Libellulidae
Odonata of Australia
Insects of New Guinea
Taxa named by Friedrich Ris
Insects described in 1913